The 1978 edition of the Campeonato Carioca kicked off on September 2, 1978 and ended on December 3, 1978. It was the last official tournament organized by FCF (Federação Carioca de Futebol, or Carioca Football Federation). Only clubs based in the Rio de Janeiro city were allowed to play. Twelve teams contested this edition. Flamengo won the title for the 18th time. no were relegated.

System
The tournament would be divided in three stages:
 Taça Guanabara: The twelve teams all played in a single round-robin format against each other. The champions qualified to the Finals.
 Taça Rio: The twelve teams all played in a single round-robin format against each other. The champions qualified to the Finals.
 Finals: Would be disputed by the two stage winners; in case the same team won both stages, the Finals wouldn't be held.

Championship

Taça Guanabara

Taça Rio

Aggregate table

References

Campeonato Carioca seasons
Carioca